Antaragni (English: "The Fire Within") is the annual cultural festival of the Indian Institute of Technology Kanpur, usually held in October. Established in 1965, the four-day-long festival attracts participants from over 350 colleges in India and has garnered substantial media attention over the years. It features professional shows, competitions, musical performances, DJs, fashion shows, Indian folk dances, and more.

History

Antaragni began as an inter-collegiate cultural event in 1965. The name of the festival was changed from Culfest to Antaragni in 1993, 27 years after its inception. The festival is entirely organised by students of IIT Kanpur, with the Antaragni chairperson being the only faculty member on the team. Over 350 Indian colleges have participated in the event.

Performances
 2006 – Vishwa Mohan Bhatt, Astad Deboo.
 2016 – Mike Candys, Sartek, Demonic Resurrection, Madboy Mink, Adnan Sami.
 2017 – DJ KSHMR, Vishal–Shekhar, Euphoria, Skyharbor.
 2018 – Amit Trivedi, DJ Quintino, The Local Train, Guthrie Govan.
 2019 – Shankar Mahadevan, Ehsaan Noorani, Loy Mendonsa.
 2020 – comedians Abhishek Upmanyu, Aakash Gupta, and Harsh Gujral; musicians The Yellow Diary and Sonu Nigam.
 2021 – Ritviz, Sunidhi Chauhan.

Notable events
 India Inspired – political forum that involves politicians, leaders, and media personalities and where socially relevant issues are discussed, with an emphasis on youth culture. In past years, it has witnessed participation from the student community. Speakers at this event have included Telugu film director Sekhar Kammula, CBSE chairman Vineet Joshi, and actress, singer,  and social activist Vasundhara Das.
 Kavi Sammelan – poetry competition. It has included appearances by painter, professor, poet, and film lyricist Rahat Indori and poet Kirti Kale.
 Filmmaking contests – judges have included Abbas Tyrewala and Luv Ranjan.
 Hindi literary events – judges have included Hindi authors Nasira Sharma, Leeladhar Jagudi, and Ravindra Prabhat.

References

External links
 

Indian Institutes of Technology festivals
Culfests
IIT Kanpur
1965 establishments in Uttar Pradesh
Festivals established in 1965